A modus operandi (often shortened to M.O.) is someone's habits of working, particularly in the context of business or criminal investigations, but also more generally. It is a Latin phrase, approximately translated as "mode (or manner) of operating".

Term
The term is often used in police work when discussing crime and addressing the methods employed by criminals. It is also used in criminal profiling, where it can help in finding clues to the offender's psychology. It largely consists of examining the actions used by the individuals to execute the crime, prevent its detection and facilitate escape. A suspect's modus operandi can assist in their identification, apprehension, or repression, and can also be used to determine links between crimes.

In business, modus operandi is used to describe a firm's preferred means of executing business and interacting with other firms.

Plural 
The word  is a gerund in the genitive case, "of operating"; gerunds can never be pluralised in Latin, as opposed to gerundives. When a noun with an attribute in the genitive is pluralised, only the head noun normally changes, just as in English with "of": "a fact of life, two facts of life" (unlike, for instance,  in French).

See also

References

Further reading

 Levinson, D. Encyclopedia of Crime and Punishment (SAGE, 2002). .
 Carlo, P. The Night Stalker: The Life and Crimes of Richard Ramirez (Pinnacle Books 1996). .

External links 
 

Criminal investigation
Criminology
Latin words and phrases
Offender profiling